Polyortha symphyla is a species of moth of the family Tortricidae. It is found in Bolivia.

References

Moths described in 1984
Polyortha
Moths of South America
Taxa named by Józef Razowski